The Men's double trap singles event took place on 7 October 2010, at the CRPF Campus.

Results

External links
Report

Shooting at the 2010 Commonwealth Games